Composing may refer to:

 Composition (language), in literature and rhetoric, producing a work in spoken tradition and written discourse, to include visuals and digital space
Visual rhetoric and composition, visual literacy as ones' ability to read an image and communicate using images
eRhetoric, online communication, composing which understands the relationship between medium and rhetorical situation  
Writing process, producing a written work
 Dance composition, the practice and teaching of choreography and the navigation or connection of choreographic structures
 Musical composition, the process of creating a new piece of music
  Composition (visual arts), the plan, placement or arrangement of the elements of art in a work